Pobit Kamak refers to the following places in Bulgaria:

 Pobit Kamak, Kyustendil Province
 Pobit Kamak, Pazardzhik Province
 Pobit Kamak, Razgrad Province